The men's 20 kilometres race walk event at the 2003 European Athletics U23 Championships was held in Bydgoszcz, Poland, on 19 July.

Medalists

Results

Final
19 July

Participation
According to an unofficial count, 11 athletes from 6 countries participated in the event.

 (2)
 (1)
 (1)
 (3)
 (3)
 (1)

References

20 kilometres race walk
Racewalking at the European Athletics U23 Championships